Kevin D. Carlson (born April 12, 1962) is an American puppeteer, best known for his role of Mr. Potato Head in The Mr. Potato Head Show and the title character in The Adventures of Timmy the Tooth.

Early life
Kevin D. Carlson was born and raised in Orange, California on April 12, 1962.

Career
Carlson is known for creating The Adventures of Timmy the Tooth (alongside Dina Fraboni and James Murray). Kevin Carlson also ran an online puppet greeting card site called PuppetGreetings featuring original characters such as Captain Bucky, Bob, Eyegore (who was previously used as Sidney Cyclops from The Adventures of Timmy the Tooth) and more. Carlson also played Clockey, Floorey and Conky on Pee-wee's Playhouse.

Filmography

Film
 Child's Play 2 - Chucky (assistant puppeteer)
 Elmopalooza - Additional Muppet Performer
 Muppet Classic Theater - Additional Muppet Performer
 Muppets Most Wanted - LA Muppet Performer
 The Muppets - Additional Muppet Performer
 Theodore Rex - Ankylosaurus Dad (puppeteer)

Television
 All That - Fuzz ("Have a Nice Day with Leroy and Fuzz" segments)
 Dinosaurs - Additional Dinosaur Performer
 Greg the Bunny - 
 Imagination Movers - Warehouse Mouse
 Late Night Buffet with Augie and Del - Joey the Monkey
 Lost on Earth - Ahab
 Muppets Tonight - Additional Muppet Performer
 Pee-wee's Playhouse - Clocky, Conkey, Floory, Knucklehead, Red Dinosaur (of the Dinosaur Family)
 The Adventures of Timmy the Tooth - Timmy the Tooth
 The Puzzle Place - Additional Performer
 The Office - Edward R. Meow (in "Take Your Daughter to Work Day")
 Where Is Warehouse Mouse? - Warehouse Mouse
 The Mr. Potato Head Show - Mr. Potato Head / Alien (in "Aliens Dig Baloney")
 American Dad - (voice) (1 episode)
 Riders in the Sky

Other
 9.1.1 for Kids: The Great 911 Adventure - Bud
 Puppet Up! - Performer
 The Muppets Take the Bowl - Additional Muppet Performer (live show at the Hollywood Bowl, Sept. 8–10, 2017)
 The Muppets Take the O2 - Additional Muppet Performer (live show at the O2 Arena, Jul. 13–14, 2018

Crew work
 Beetlejuice - Puppeteer
 Cats & Dogs - Puppeteer
 Dr. Dolittle - Puppeteer
 Dr. Dolittle 2 - Puppeteer
 Forgetting Sarah Marshall - Puppeteer
 Men in Black II - Puppeteer (uncredited)
 Team America: World Police - Principal Puppeteer
 The Adventures of Timmy the Tooth - Creator, Co-Producer, Writer

References

External links
 

1962 births
Living people
American puppeteers